William and Mary often refers to:

 The joint reign of William III of England (II of Scotland) and Mary II of England (and Scotland)
 William and Mary style, a furniture design common from 1700 to 1725 named for the couple

William and Mary may also refer to:

Organizations
College of William & Mary in Virginia, or associated organizations:
William & Mary Law School
William & Mary Pep Band
William & Mary Police
William & Mary Tribe athletic teams representing the College
William and Mary Quarterly, a history journal

Media
"William and Mary" (short story), published in 1959 by Roald Dahl
William and Mary (TV series), a British romantic comedy-drama

Vessels
, a schooner known as William and Mary before Royal Navy service

, see List of royal yachts of the United Kingdom

Other uses
Fort William and Mary, defended by soldiers of New Castle, New Hampshire

See also
 
 
 Victoria and Albert (disambiguation)